The Senior German Open was a men's senior (over 50) professional golf tournament on the European Senior Tour. It was held for the first time in July 1995 as the International German PGA Seniors Championship at Golfpark Idstein near Frankfurt am Main, Germany and was the first European Senior Tour event to be held in Germany.

Winners

References

External links
Coverage on the European Senior Tour's official site

Former European Senior Tour events
Golf tournaments in Germany